Ellen Perez and Tamara Zidanšek defeated Veronika Kudermetova and Elise Mertens in the final, 6–3, 5–7, [12–10] to win the women's doubles tennis title at the 2022 Rosmalen Grass Court Championships. They saved a championship point en route to the title.

Shuko Aoyama and Aleksandra Krunić were the reigning champions from when the tournament was last held in 2019, but neither returned to participate after Krunić chose not to compete and Aoyama played in Nottingham instead.

Seeds

Draw

Draw

References

External links
Main draw

Libéma Open - Doubles
2022 Women's Doubles